No. 46 Squadron of the Royal Flying Corps and the Royal Air Force, formed in 1916, was disbanded and re-formed three times before its last disbandment in 1975. It served in both World War I and World War II.

World War I 

No. 46 Squadron was formed at Wyton aerodrome on 19 April 1916, from a nucleus trained in No. 2 Reserve Squadron; it moved to France in October of that year equipped with Nieuport two-seater aircraft.

The squadron undertook artillery co-operation, photography, and reconnaissance operations until May 1917, when it took on a more offensive role after rearming with the Sopwith Pup.  It was based at the aerodrome at La Gorgue from 12 May to 6 July 1917.

The change from a corps to a fighter squadron came at a moment when Allied air superiority was being seriously challenged by Germany, in particular through the introduction of the "circuses" formed and led by Manfred von Richthofen. Operating under the 11th Army Wing, the squadron was intensively engaged and had many combats with the enemy. In July 1917, No. 46 Squadron returned to Sutton's Farm (later Hornchurch) in Essex, for the defence of London, which had been heavily raided by Gotha bombers a short time before; no enemy aircraft penetrated its patrol area. The squadron returned to France at the end of August.

In addition to offensive patrol work, the unit undertook extensive ground strafing and did close support work in the attack on Messines Ridges.

In November 1917, the squadron was equipped with Sopwith Camels, and gave valuable assistance to the infantry in the Battle of Cambrai attack.

During the last year of the war, the squadron bombed lines of communication and ammunition dumps in the enemy's rear areas.

Intensive low-level ground attack work was carried out after the German spring offensive, in March 1918; 46 Squadron suffered high casualties as a result.

In June 1918, the squadron became part of No. 80 Wing RAF, at Serny, Pas-de-Calais. From 26 June, it was commanded by Lieutenant-Colonel Louis Strange. The wing specialised in large scale attacks on enemy airfields. In October and November, the squadron was heavily involved in attacks during the German Great Retreat, during the weeks before the signing of the Armistice.

Towards the end of January 1919, the squadron was reduced to a cadre, and in February it was returned to England early; it was disbanded on 31 December.

During the war, 46 Squadron claimed 184 air victories, creating 16 aces.

 Donald MacLaren joined the squadron in November 1917. MacLaren was credited with shooting down 48 aeroplanes and six balloons, making him one of the top aces of World War I; 
 Cecil (Chaps) Marchant;
 George Thomson; 
 Harry Robinson; 
 Clive Brewster-Joske; 
 Roy McConnell, DFC; 
 Maurice D. G. Scott; 
 Maurice Freehill; and
 Philip Tudhope.

Other members of the squadron during World War I included:
 Victor Yeates, the author of Winged Victory,</ref> and;
 Arthur Gould Lee, who authored No Parachute  and later achieved the rank of later Air Vice Marshal.

Between wars 

The squadron was re-formed at Kenley under the RAF expansion scheme in 1936 by equipping B flight of No. 17 Squadron RAF as a full squadron. Gloster Gauntlets were the first airplanes to be allocated, and with these craft normal peacetime training activities were carried out. Wing Commander Bunny Currant, a future ace, joined the squadron as a sergeant pilot. Wing Commander Ian Gleed DSO DFC, another future ace, was posted the squadron as his first assignment after earning his wings on Christmas Day 1936.

World War II

Norway 
The outbreak of war found 46 Squadron at RAF Digby, equipped with Hawker Hurricanes. Action with the enemy came quickly when, at the end of October 1939, Squadron Leader Barwell, Pilot Officer Plummer and F/Sgt Edward Shackley attacked a formation of 12 Heinkel 115s, destroying one each, and scattering the remainder. The next six months were uneventful, consisting in the main of providing air cover for the shipping convoys steaming along the East Coast; a few enemy aircraft were sighted but no contacts were made.

In May 1940, the squadron was selected to form part of the Expeditionary Force in Norway, which had been invaded by the Germans on 9 April. No. 46 Squadron assembled at Bardufoss and began operation on 26 May; patrols were maintained over the land and naval forces at Narvik without respite, some of the pilots going without sleep for more than 48 hours. Conditions on the ground were very basic with poor runways and primitive servicing and repair facilities.

Many air combats took place, and in its brief campaign in Norway the squadron accounted for at least 14 enemy aircraft, besides probably destroying many others. On 7 June the squadron was ordered to evacuate Norway immediately and, on the night of 7 through 8 June, the Hurricanes were successfully flown back to Glorious — a dangerous procedure as none of the aircraft were fitted with deck arrester hooks. 
The two pilots who survived were the Squadron Commander, Squadron Leader (later Air Chief Marshal) "Bing" Cross, and the Flight Commander, Flight Lieutenant (later Air Commodore) "Jamie" Jameson.

Battle of Britain 
The squadron re-formed at RAF Digby, becoming operational once again at the end of June, and for the next two months it was occupied in uneventful convoy and defensive patrols before moving south to Stapleford Tawney, the satellite of RAF North Weald, for the defence of London during the Battle of Britain. The Luftwaffe's main effort at the time was against coastal objectives and shipping off the coast of Essex and Kent.

The squadron, now consisting of novice pilots and without any experienced command after its decimation in Norway, suffered heavy casualties during continuous action against far superior numbers of enemy bombers and escorting fighters. But the enemy sustained such shattering losses amongst their long-range bomber forces that they had to change their tactics. The attacking forces began to fly their fighter bombers at very high altitudes and to make use of every possible patch of cloud cover. Interception became difficult, and the squadron had to change its tactics too – principally maintaining patrols at heights between 20,000 and 30,000 feet.

Early in November 1940, No. 46 Squadron, whilst on patrol over the town of Foulness, encountered some 50 Italian bombers and fighters; at least eight of them were destroyed, with no casualties or damage to the squadron, and the remainder of the Italians scattered in disorder.

The squadron claimed 34 aircraft destroyed July to December 1940, but lost 26 aircraft itself, with 16 pilots killed and three badly wounded.
After the Battle of Britain ended. the squadron engaged in convoy patrols, interspersed with escort duty to medium bombers in their attack on objectives in occupied France.

North Africa 

In May 1941, the squadron was withdrawn from the line in preparation for going overseas; they embarked on the SS Almanzora at the end of the month.  The ground crews reached Egypt early in July and with the squadron headquarters at Kilo 17 Fayoum Road, various detachments cooperated in the formation of maintenance, repair, and salvage units.

Pilots were operating in the defence of Malta, first as 46 Squadron and later absorbed into 126 Squadron. They were in action continuously, claiming the destruction of nearly 10 German and 10 Italian aircraft,

In May 1942, the airmen moved to Idku and reformed as a night fighter squadron with Beaufighters for action in the eastern Mediterranean.  They became operational at the end of the month, and their main tasks were the interception of enemy reconnaissance and bombing aircraft, principally over Alexandria, and the escort of shipping convoys laden with supplies for Malta. At the end of October, after the 8th Army's advance from El Alamein, 46 Squadron carried out attacks on the retreating enemy columns in the Mersa Matruh area.

In November 1942, the squadron was reorganised as part of the RAF Coastal Command and operated convoy cover in Malta and Benghazi. Targets in Africa and Sicily were strafed and barges, trawlers and other small ships were attacked along the Tripolitanian coast with cannon and machine-gun fire. The New Year found the squadron preparing to resume its original role as a night fighter unit and at the end of January, two detachments left Idku — one for Tobruk and the other for RAF Abu Sueir. By the end of April two more detachments were operating at St. Jean (Palestine) and Bu Amud. With the most distant bases nearly 1,000 miles apart, administration of the squadron became very difficult.
 
Some out-of-the-ordinary tasks came the squadron's way. On one occasion, the Bu Amud detachment searched and found a convoy of local troops who were lost in the desert and long overdue; on another a grounded destroyer was located and given air cover until it could be refloated.

In April 1943, for the first time in the war a night fighter was controlled from a warship – the squadron's signal officer, Flight Lieutenant Muir a Canadian, having devised a homing beacon for use on the controlling ship. In July, with confirmed "kills" for one year's operations in the Middle East standing at 31, the squadron helped shepherd the invasion fleet sailing for Sicily. The end of August found a large detachment stationed in Cyprus with the main task of doing night intruder operations over Rhodes. On 14 September, Squadron leader Cuddie in command of the detachment, landed on the recently seized Dodecanese Island of Kos — the first Allied aircraft to do so; less than three weeks later the Germans invaded and Wing Commander G.A. Reid was killed.

In early 1944, with detachments operating from Abu Sueir, St. Jean and Tocra, night intruder patrols over Rhodes, Kos and Crete formed the backbone of activities. In February and March, the squadron claimed the destruction of five Junkers Ju 52s and the probable destruction of three more. April and May were quiet, despite the dovetailing of patrols with No. 252 Squadron over the islands, giving complete coverage from dusk to dawn. In September, the aircraft were controlled by HMS Ulster Queen, a Ground-controlled interception ship and the score for the month amounted to 11 enemy aircraft destroyed.
 
From 26 September to 11 October (a full-moon period) a detachment was established at Gambut and 16 enemy aircraft were destroyed, with one probable and four damaged.  Four airmen were decorated for their part:
 Warrant Officer Roy Butler (pilot), distinguished flying cross (five planes destroyed)
 Warrant Officer Ray Graham (navigator), distinguished flying cross
 Warrant Officer Denis Hammond (pilot), distinguished flying cross (three destroyed or damaged)
 Flight Sergeant Harrison (navigator) distinguished flying medal

A Ju 52 destroyed by the detachment on 3 October was the last German aircraft destroyed by the squadron and with the withdrawal of German forces from Greece almost completed, the airmen ended their mission.

End of the war

The airmen arrived at RAF Stoney Cross at the beginning of January 1945 and began operation under Transport Command. Equipped with the Short Stirling, they manned service to the Far East between Stoney Cross and RAF Arkonam via Poona and between Stoney Cross and Dum Dum via Palam. 
With the end of the war in August 1945, flights were first confined to India and the Middle East and then, with Dakotas replacing the Stirlings at the beginning of 1946, passengers and freight were carried mostly to Rome, Berlin, Warsaw, and Vienna.

Berlin Airlift 
The squadron moved to RAF Manston in October 1946 and to Abingdon in December.  From July 1948, the squadron was almost exclusively engaged on the Berlin Airlift; it operated at first from Wunsdorf, carrying food, and later from Fassberg and Lübeck, carrying coal. It returned to RAF Oakington in August 1949 and resumed its normal transport role until it disbanded on 20 February 1950.

First postwar re-formation

Meteors 

The squadron once again re-formed, this time at RAF Odiham on 15 August 1954 as a night fighter unit equipped with Meteor NF12s and 14s.  Training began almost immediately, but it took until the end of October for the squadron to reach a strength of 12 NF12 or 14s and one Meteor 7 for training and categorisation.

When Wing Commander Birchfield took over as commanding officer from Squadron Leader Ross, the manpower situation was improving, but mechanical-transport shortages caused problems for the squadron, whose dispersal was on the opposite side of the airfield from the rest of the station. By June 1955, the squadron had received "some Meteor 8s for target towing" and its strength had reached 48 officers and 110 airmen.  By August, when the squadron went to Acklington for its armament practice station, there were 16 aircraft.

Javelins 

In January 1956, the unit began converting to Javelins, and the first arrived in February, together with eight Meteor NF 11s: the NF 12s were sent off to No. 72 Squadron RAF. By May, all squadron pilots had converted and 15 Javelins were held; eight were earmarked for intensive flying trials whose target was 1,000 hours in two months – a feat believed by some to be impossible, but achieved in fact by "a wartime spirit."  On 15 June, the squadron lost its commanding officer, Wing Commander Birchfield, in a Javelin crash.  He was replaced by Wing Commander Harold ("Harry") E. White DFC** AFC (subsequently appointed CBE on retiring as an Air Commodore in 1978).

Over the years, the squadron continued to train by participating in many exercises such as Halyard, Cold Wing, Kingpin Adex, Ciano and Bombex, and it took part in various trials, including those of new pressure suits and helmets.  The problem of poor serviceability and lack of spares continued when the Mk 2 Javelins replaced the Mk 1s in 1957.

In April 1959, the squadron sent six Javelins for an exchange visit to the French Air Force 1/30 Squadron at Tours, whilst the French sent Sud Aviation Vautour aircraft to Odiham. In June the squadron won the Ingpen Trophy after being third in 1957 and second in 1958. On 30 June 1961, the squadron was disbanded again.

Second postwar re-formation

Andovers 

On 1 September 1966, the squadron again was re-formed, this time at RAF Abingdon as a transport unit. The first Hawker Siddeley Andover CMk1 aircraft arrived in December, and the squadron was tasked with transport support and tactical transport, for which the Andover's ability to "kneel" – to allow vehicle entry at a shallow angle via the rear ramp – was an asset. Over the years, the squadron acquired expertise in aero-medical evacuation, short take-off and landing, route flying and parachute and one-ton container drops. In addition to carrying equipment, vehicles, passengers or paratroops, the Andover could be fitted in a VIP role and carried Cabinet Ministers including (the late) John Davies, Julian Amery and Lord Carrington and was used for the parachute jump of HRH Prince Charles into Studland Bay during his RAF training in July 1971.

It also carried out various trials with voice broadcast and long-range ferry tanks. The latter became a regular item of equipment and enabled the short-range Andover to fly long distances, such as Gander to Abingdon direct in well under eight hours.

The detachment took part in exercises in Libya, Cyprus, the Middle East, and Norway, as well as in the UK and Germany. It won the Lord VC Trophy in 1968 and again in 1971, when it also won the No. 14 Air Dispatch Trophy. In July 1968, the squadron supported Exercise Icy Mountains in Greenland, re-supplying it, and finally recovering the team. In March 1969, three aircraft were deployed to Coolidge, Antigua, to help with the Anguillan crisis. The deployment continued, albeit later at a reduced scale, until early 1971 and led to the Caribbean Trainers. The squadron was the first in the RAF to have a German exchange officer, and exchange visits were made between 46 Squadron and LTG 63 at Ahlhorn and Hohn in Germany.

In August 1969, the unit became involved in Northern Ireland duties – in particular, personnel transport – and on 13 October the same year, it was presented with its standard by King Olav V of Norway in commemoration of the squadron's 1940 Norwegian operation.

In September 1970, the squadron moved to RAF Thorney Island and began a period of extended worldwide activity by taking part in a large Far East reinforcement exercise, Bersatu Padu. In 1971 it began a two-aircraft detachment at Masirah (and added SAR to its many roles). In November 1971 and February 1972, it took part in Exercise Cold Stream with the Italian Air Force at Pisa and in Exercise Sun Pirate in Puerto Rico.

While flying the RAF Falcons on 8 April 1972, the Royal Air Force Parachute Team, one of Sqn 46's Andover, XS-609, crashed on takeoff at Siena, Italy, killing four passengers.

Twice a year, the squadron took part in Exercise MACDROP at RAF Machrihanish, in which Andovers were employed in parachute dropping with the Parachute Regiment, and SAS. In January and December 1974, unit aircraft supported Royal Engineers in Exercise Mirza – four-month civil-aid programmes whose main task was the construction of bridges in Sudan.

Finally, in March 1975 the closure of RAF Thorney Island and the dissolution of the squadron was announced. An immediate reduction in the number of aircraft and a drastic reduction in flying hours followed.
On 31 August 1975 the squadron standard was laid up in Chichester Cathedral, and the unit was disbanded.
A number of Andovers were converted to flight calibration duties with No. 115 Squadron RAF at RAF Benson, two went to Boscombe Down and one (XS641) was shifted to photo reconnaissance role to provide the U.K.'s asset for the Open Skies Treaty. Later 10 Andovers were sold to the Royal New Zealand Air Force

Reunions 
The squadron is unique in the Royal Air Force because it is the only one to have held reunions since 1917. The squadron's Association has held annual Reunion Dinners continuously since 1917. The 100th consecutive Reunion was held in the Officers' Mess, RAF Benson, on 3 June 2017.

Aircraft

Locations

Commanding officers

References

External links

 First World War No. 46 Squadron Aircraft & Markings
 John Fraser Drummond: 46 Squadron in Norway

046
046
Military units and formations established in 1916
1916 establishments in the United Kingdom
Military units and formations in Mandatory Palestine in World War II